The 2007–08 Butler Bulldogs men's basketball team represented Butler University in the 2007–08 NCAA Division I men's basketball season. Their head coach was Brad Stevens, serving his 1st year. The Bulldogs played their home games at the Hinkle Fieldhouse, which has a capacity of approximately 10,000.

The Bulldogs won the 2008 Horizon League Men's Basketball Regular Season Championship and the 2008 Horizon League Men's Basketball tournament championship, earning the Horizon League's automatic bid to the 2008 NCAA Division I men's basketball tournament, earning a 7 seed in the East Region. They beat 10 seed South Alabama 81–61 before falling to 2 seed Tennessee 71–76 in overtime in the Round of 32.

Roster

Schedule

|-
!colspan=9 style="background:#13294B; color:#FFFFFF;"| Exhibition

|-
!colspan=9 style="background:#13294B; color:#FFFFFF;"|Non-conference regular season

|-
!colspan=9 style="background:#13294B; color:#FFFFFF;"|Horizon League Play

|-
!colspan=9 style="background:#13294B; color:#FFFFFF;"| Horizon League tournament

|-
!colspan=9 style="background:#13294B; color:#FFFFFF;"| NCAA tournament

Rankings

References

Butler Bulldogs Men's
Butler Bulldogs men's basketball seasons
Butler
Butl
Butl